This page details the history of the programming language and software product Delphi.

Roots and birth 

Delphi evolved from Borland's Turbo Pascal for Windows, itself an evolution with Windows support from Borland's Turbo Pascal and Borland Pascal with Objects, very fast 16-bit native-code MS-DOS compilers with their own sophisticated integrated development environment (IDE) and textual user interface toolkit for DOS (Turbo Vision). Early Turbo Pascal (for MS-DOS) was written in a dialect of the Pascal programming language; in later versions support for objects was added, and it was named Object Pascal.

Delphi was originally one of many codenames of a pre-release development tool project at Borland. Borland developer Danny Thorpe suggested the Delphi codename in reference to the Oracle at Delphi. One of the design goals of the product was to provide database connectivity to programmers as a key feature and a popular database package at the time was Oracle database; hence, "If you want to talk to [the] Oracle, go to Delphi".

As development continued towards the first release, the Delphi codename gained popularity among the development team and beta testing group. However, the Borland marketing leadership preferred a functional product name over an iconic name and made preparations to release the product under the name Borland AppBuilder.

Shortly before the release of the Borland product in 1995, Novell AppBuilder was released, leaving Borland in need of a new product name. After much debate and many market research surveys, the Delphi codename became the Delphi product name.

Early Borland years (1995–2003) 

 Borland Delphi
Delphi (later known as Delphi 1) was released in 1995 for the 16-bit Windows 3.1, and was an early example of what became known as Rapid Application Development (RAD) tools. Delphi 1 features included:
 Visual two-way tools
 Property Method Event (PME) model
 TObject, records, component, and owner memory management
 Visual Component Library (VCL)
 Runtime Library (RTL)
 Structured exception handling
 Data-aware components live at design time
 Database support via BDE and SQL Links

 Borland Delphi 2
Delphi 2, released in 1996, supported 32-bit Windows environments and bundled with Delphi 1 to retain 16-bit Windows 3.1 application development. New Quickreport components replacing Borland ReportSmith. Delphi 2 also introduced:
 Database Grid
 OLE automation
 Visual form inheritance
 Long strings (beyond 255)

 Borland Delphi 3
Delphi 3, released in 1997, added:
 New VCL components encapsulating the 4.71 version of Windows Common Controls (such as Rebar and Toolbar)
 TDataset architecture separated from BDE
 DLL debugging
 Code insight technology
 Component packages, and templates, and integration with COM through interfaces.
 DecisionCube and Teechart components for statistical graphing
 WebBroker
 ActiveForms
 MIDAS three tier architecture

Inprise Delphi 4
Inprise Delphi 4, released in 1998, completely overhauled the editor and became dockable. It was the last version shipped with Delphi 1 for 16-bit programming.  New features included:
 VCL added support for ActionLists anchors and constraints.
 Method overloading
 Dynamic arrays
 High performance database drivers
 Windows 98 and Microsoft BackOffice support
 Java interoperability
 CORBA development

 Borland Delphi 5
Borland Delphi 5 was released in 1999 and improved upon Delphi 4 by adding:
 Frames
 Parallel development
 Translation capabilities
 Enhanced integrated debugger
 XML support
 ADO database support 
 Reference counting interfaces

 Borland Delphi 6
Shipped in 2001, Delphi 6 supported both Linux (using the name Kylix) and Windows for the first time and offered a cross-platform alternative to the VCL known as CLX. Delphi 6 also added:
 The Structure window
 SOAP web services
 dbExpress
 BizSnap, WebSnap, and DataSnap

 Borland Delphi 7
Delphi 7, released in August 2002, added support for:
 Web application development
 Windows XP Themes
Used by more Delphi developers than any other single version, Delphi 7 is one of the most successful IDEs created by Borland.  Its stability, speed, and low hardware requirements led to active use through 2020.

Later Borland years (2003–2008)

 Borland Delphi 8
Delphi 8 (Borland Developer Studio 2.0), released December 2003, was a .NET-only release that compiled Delphi Object Pascal code into .NET CIL. The IDE changed to a docked interface (called Galileo) similar to Microsoft's Visual Studio.NET. Delphi 8 was highly criticized for its low quality and its inability to create native applications (Win32 API/x86 code). The inability to generate native applications is only applicable to this release; the capability would be restored in the next release.

 Borland Delphi 2005
The next version, Delphi 2005 (Delphi 9, also Borland Developer Studio 3.0), included the Win32 and .NET development in a single IDE, reiterating Borland's commitment to Win32 developers. Delphi 2005 included:
 Regained ability to compile native windows applications (*.exe) after being removed in Delphi 8.
 Design-time manipulation of live data from a database
 Improved IDE with multiple themes
 for ... in statement (like C#'s foreach) to the language. 
 Multi-unit namespaces
 Error insight
 History tab
 Function inlining
 Refactoring
 Wild-card in uses statements
 Data Explorer
 Integrated unit testing

Delphi 2005 was widely criticized for its bugs; both Delphi 8 and Delphi 2005 had stability problems when shipped, which were only partially resolved in service packs. CLX support was dropped for new applications from this release onwards.

 Borland Delphi 2006
In late 2005 Delphi 2006 (Delphi 10, also Borland Developer Studio 4.0) was released combining development of C# and Delphi.NET, Delphi Win32 and C++ (Preview when it was shipped but stabilized in Update 1) into a single IDE. It was much more stable than Delphi 8 or Delphi 2005 when shipped, and improved further with the release of two updates and several hotfixes.  Delphi 2006 included:
 Operator overloading
 Static methods and properties
 Designer Guidelines, Form positioner view
 Live code templates, block completion
 Line numbers, change bars, sync-edit
 Code folding and method navigation
 Debugging Tool-Tips
 Searchable Tool Palette
 FastMM memory manager
 Support for MySQL
 Unicode support in dbExpress

Turbo Delphi and Turbo Delphi for .NET

On September 6, 2006, The Developer Tools Group (the working name of the not yet spun off company) of Borland Software Corporation released single-language editions of Borland Developer Studio 2006, bringing back the Turbo name. The Turbo product set included Turbo Delphi for Win32, Turbo Delphi for .NET, Turbo C++, and Turbo C#. There were two variants of each edition: Explorer, a free downloadable flavor, and a Professional flavor, priced at US$899 for new users and US$399 for upgrades, which opened access to thousands of third-party components. Unlike earlier Personal editions of Delphi, Explorer editions could be used for commercial development.

 Delphi Transfer
On February 8, 2006, Borland announced that it was looking for a buyer for its IDE and database line of products, including Delphi, to concentrate on its ALM line. Instead of selling it, Borland transferred the development tools group to an independent, wholly owned subsidiary company named CodeGear on November 14, 2006.

Codegear Delphi 2007
Delphi 2007 (Delphi 11), the first version by CodeGear, was released on March 16, 2007. The Win32 personality was released first, before the .NET personality of Delphi 2007 based on .NET Framework 2.0 was released as part of the CodeGear RAD Studio 2007 product.  For the first time, Delphi could be downloaded from the internet and activated with a license key. New features included:
 Support for MSBuild, build events, and build configurations
 Enhancements to the VCL for Windows Vista
 dbExpress 4 with connection pooling and delegate drivers
 CPU viewer windows
 FastCode enhancements
 IntraWeb / AJAX support
 Language support for French, German, and Japanese

Delphi 2007 also dropped a few features:
 C#Builder due to low sales as a result of Visual Studio also offering C#. 
 The Windows Form designer for Delphi .NET because it was based on part of the .NET framework API changed so drastically in .NET 2.0 that updating the IDE would have been a major undertaking.

Internationalized versions of Delphi 2007 shipped simultaneously in English, French, German and Japanese. RAD Studio 2007 (code named Highlander), which included .NET and C++Builder development, was released on September 5, 2007.

Delphi for PHP
The CodeGear era produced an IDE targeting PHP development despite the word "Delphi" in the product name. Delphi for PHP was a VCL-like PHP framework that enabled the same Rapid Application Development methodology for PHP as in ASP.NET Web Form. Versions 1.0 and 2.0 were released in March 2007 and April 2008 respectively. The IDE would later evolve into RadPHP after CodeGear's acquisition by Embarcadero.

Embarcadero years (2008–2015) 
Borland sold CodeGear to Embarcadero Technologies in 2008. Embarcadero retained the CodeGear division created by Borland to identify its tool and database offerings but identified its own database tools under the DatabaseGear name.

Codegear Delphi 2009
Delphi 2009 (Delphi 12, code named Tiburón), added many new features:
 Full Unicode support in VCL and RTL components
 Generics
 Anonymous methods for Win32 native development
 Ribbon controls
 DataSnap library updates
 Build configurations
 Class Explorer
 PNG support

Delphi 2009 dropped support for .NET development, replaced by the Delphi Prism developed by RemObjects Software.

Codegear Delphi 2010
Delphi 2010 (code-named Weaver, aka Delphi 14; there was no version 13), was released on August 25, 2009, and is the second Unicode release of Delphi. It included:
 A new compiler run-time type information (RTTI) system
 Support for Windows 7 
 Direct2D canvas
 Touch screen and gestures
 Source code formatter
 Debugger visualizers
 Thread-specific breakpoints
 Background compilation
 Source Code Audits and Metrics
 The option to also have the old style component palette in the IDE.

Embarcadero Delphi XE
Delphi XE (aka Delphi 2011, code named Fulcrum), was released on August 30, 2010, and improved upon the development environment and language with:
 Regular Expression library
 Subversion integration
 dbExpress filters, authentication, proxy generation, JavaScript framework, and REST support
 Indy WebBroker
 Support for Amazon EC2 and Microsoft Azure 
 Build groups
 Named Threads in the debugger
 Command line audits, metrics, and document generation

Delphi Starter Edition
On January 27, 2011, Embarcadero announced the availability of a new Starter Edition that gives independent developers, students and micro businesses a slightly reduced feature set for a price less than a quarter of that of the next-cheapest version. This Starter edition is based upon Delphi XE with update 1.

Embarcadero Delphi XE2

On September 1, 2011, Embarcadero released RAD Studio XE2 (code-named Pulsar), which included Delphi XE2, C++Builder, Embarcadero Prism XE2 (Version 5.0 later upgraded to XE2.5 Version 5.1) which was rebranded from Delphi Prism and RadPHP XE2 (Version 4.0). Delphi XE2 included:
 Native support for 64-bit Windows (except the starter edition) in addition to the long-supported 32-bit versions, with some backwards compatibility. Applications for 64-bit platforms could be compiled, but not tested or run, on the 32-bit platform. The XE2 IDE cannot debug 64-bit programs on Windows 8 and above. 
 A new library called FireMonkey that supports Windows, Mac OS X and the Apple iPhone, iPod Touch and iPad portable devices. FireMonkey and VCL are not compatible; one or the other must be used, and older VCL applications cannot use Firemonkey unless user interfaces are recreated with FireMonkey forms and controls. Third parties have published information on how to use Firemonkey forms in VCL software, to facilitate gradual migration, but even then VCL and Firemonkey controls cannot be used on the same form. 
 Live Bindings for VCL and FireMonkey
 VCL Styles
 Unit scope names
 Platform Assistant
 DataSnap connectors for mobile devices, cloud API, HTTPS support, and TCP monitoring
 dbExpress support for ODBC drivers
 Deployment manager
Embarcadero said that Linux operating system support "is being considered for the roadmap", as is Android, and that they are "committed to ... FireMonkey. ... expect regular and frequent updates to FireMonkey". Pre-2013 versions only supported iOS platform development with Xcode 4.2.1 and lower, OS X version 10.7 and lower, and iOS SDK 4.3 and earlier.

Embarcadero Delphi XE3
On September 4, 2012, Embarcadero released RAD Studio XE3, which included Delphi XE3, C++Builder, Embarcadero Prism XE3 (Version 5.2) and HTML5 Builder XE3 (Version 5.0) which was upgraded and rebranded from RadPHP. Delphi XE3 added:
 Native support for both 32-bit and 64-bit editions of Windows (including Windows 8), Mac OS X with the Firemonkey 2/FM² framework. 
 FMX (FireMonkey) actions, touch/gestures, layouts, and anchors
 FMX support for bitmap styles
 FMX audio/video
 VCL/FMX support for sensor devices
 FMX location sensor component
 Virtual keyboard support
 DirectX 10 support

Embarcadero Delphi XE4
On April 22, 2013, Embarcadero released RAD Studio XE4, which included Delphi XE4, and C++Builder but dropped Embarcadero Prism and HTML5 Builder. XE4 included the following changes:
 Two new compilers for Delphi mobile applications – the Delphi Cross Compiler for the iOS Simulator and the Delphi Cross Compiler for the iOS Devices. These compilers significantly differ from the Win64 desktop compiler as they do not support COM, inline assembly of CPU instructions, and six older string types such as PChar. The new mobile compilers advance the notion of eliminating pointers. The new compilers require an explicit style of marshalling data to and from external APIs and libraries. 
 Delphi XE4 Run-Time Library (RTL) is optimized for 0-based, read-only (immutable) Unicode strings, that cannot be indexed for the purpose of changing their individual characters. The RTL also adds status-bit based exception routines for ARM CPUs that do not generate exception interrupts.
 iOS styles, retina styles, virtual keyboards, app store deployment manager
 Mobile form designer
 Web browser component, motion and orientation sensor components
 ListView component
 Platform services and notifications
 FireDAC universal data access components
 Interbase IBLite and IBToGO

Embarcadero Delphi XE5
On September 12, 2013, Embarcadero released RAD Studio XE5, which included Delphi XE5 and C++Builder. It added:
 Android support (specifically: ARM v7 devices running Gingerbread (2.3.3–2.3.7), Ice Cream Sandwich (4.0.3–4.0.4) and Jelly Bean (4.1.x, 4.2.x, 4.3.x))
 Deployment manager for Android
 iOS 7 style support
 REST Services client access and authentication components

Embarcadero Delphi XE6
On April 15, 2014, Embarcadero released RAD Studio XE6, which included Delphi XE6 and C++Builder. It allows developers to create natively compiled apps for all platforms for, desktop, mobile, and wearable devices like Google Glass, with a single C++ or Object Pascal (Delphi) codebase. RAD Studio XE6 added:
 Windows 7 and 8.1 styles
 Access to Cloud-based RESTful web services
 FireDAC compatibility with more databases
 Fully integrated InterBase support

Embarcadero Delphi XE7
On September 2, 2014, Embarcadero released RAD Studio XE7, which included Delphi XE7 and C++Builder. Its biggest development enabled Delphi/Object Pascal and C++ developers to extend existing Windows applications and build apps that connect desktop and mobile devices with gadgets, cloud services, and enterprise data and API by compiling FMX projects for both desktop and mobile devices.  XE7 also included:
 IBLite embeddable database for Windows, Mac, Android, and iOS
 Multi-display support
 Multi-touch support and gesture changes
 Full-screen immersive mode for Android
 Pull-to-refresh feature for TListView on iOS and Android
 FMX save state feature.

Embarcadero Delphi XE8
On April 7, 2015, Embarcadero released RAD Studio XE8, which included Delphi XE8 and C++Builder.  XE8 added the following tools:
 GetIt Package Manager
 Embarcadero Community toolbar
 Native presentation of TListView, TSwitch, TMemo, TCalendar, TMultiView, and TEdit on iOS
 Interactive maps
 New options for Media Library
 InputQuery support for masking input fields
 FireDAC improvements

Embarcadero Delphi 10 Seattle
On August 31, 2015, Embarcadero released RAD Studio 10 Seattle, which included Delphi and C++Builder.  Seattle included:
 Android Background Services support
 TBeaconDevice class for turning a supported platform device into a "beacon"
 FireDAC support for NoSQL MongoDB database
 FireMonkey controls zOrder support for Windows
 Support for calling WinRT APIs
 StyleViewer for Windows 10 Style in Bitmap Style Designer
 High-DPI awareness and 4k monitor support

Update 1 (Delphi 10.0.1) was released November 2015 and added:
 FMX Grid control for iOS
 iOS native UI styling
 New FMX feature demos
 Platform support for iOS 10 and macOS Sierra

Idera years (2015–present), under the Embarcadero brand 

In October 2015, Embarcadero was purchased by Idera Software. Idera continues to run the developer tools division under the Embarcadero brand.

Embarcadero Delphi 10.1 Berlin
On April 20, 2016, Embarcadero released RAD Studio 10.1 Berlin, which included Delphi and C++Builder, both generating native code for the 32- and 64-bit Windows platforms, OSX, iOS and Android (ARM, MIPS and X86 processors). Delphi 10.1 Berlin introduced:
 Windows Desktop Bridge support
 Android 6.0 support
 EMS Apache Server support
 Hint property changes
 Address book for iOS and Android
 CalendarView control

Delphi 10.1.1 Update 1
Released September 2016, Update 1 added:
 TGrid support for  iOS
 ControlType toggle for Platform or Render
 FMX ListView Items Designer
 FMX Search Filter
 Deployment of iOS apps to macOS Sierra
 50+ Internet of Things packages

Delphi 10.1.2 Update 2
Released December 2016, Update 2 included:
 Windows 10 App Store deployment
 Quick Edit feature for VCL Form Designer
 VCL calendar controls that mimic Window RT and provide backwards compatibility
 Windows 10 styles for VCL and FMX

Embarcadero Delphi 10.2 Tokyo
On March 22, 2017, Embarcadero released RAD Studio 10.2 Tokyo, adding:
 64-bit Linux support, limited to console and non-visual applications. 
 FireDAC Linux support for Linux-capable DBMS
 MariaDB, MySQL, and SQL Server support, InterBase 2017 included in main installation
 Firebird support for Direct I/O
 New VCL controls for Windows 10

Delphi 10.2.1 Update 1
Released August 2017, Update 1 included:
 Improved QPS (Quality, Performance, Stability)
 Over 140 fixes to customer reported Quality Portal issues
 BPL package loading for Windows Creators Update
 Improved support for latest versions of iOS and XCode
 TEdit improvements on latest Android, faster controls rendering
 Parse API for other providers
 FireDAC improvements for SQL Server, InterBase 2017, ODBC

Delphi 10.2.2 Update 2
Released December 2017, Update 2 included:
 New VCL Controls and Layouts (Panels)
 Dataset to JSON
 Mobile platforms QPS
 RAD Server licensing
 User Experience improvements (manage platforms, progress bar on loading etc.)
 FMX QuickEdits
 Dark IDE Theme

Delphi 10.2.3 Update 3
Released March 2018, Update 3 included:
 Expanded RAD Server/ExtJS support
 InterBase 2017 included in main installation
 Mobile Support included in basic package
 FMX UI Templates

Embarcadero Delphi 10.2 Tokyo (Community Edition)
On July 18, 2018, Embarcadero released Community Edition for free download. You are not allowed to earn more than $5,000. Library source code and VCL/FMX components are more limited compared to Professional.

Embarcadero Delphi 10.3 Rio
On November 21, 2018, Embarcadero released RAD Studio 10.3 Rio. This release had a lot of improvements, including:
 New Delphi language features – inline block-local variable declarations and type inference
 FireMonkey Android zOrder, native controls, and API Level 26
 Windows 10 VCL and High DPI improvements
 RAD Server architecture extension and Docker support
 Android push notification

Delphi 10.3.1 Update 1
Released February 2019, Update 1 included:
 Expanded support for iOS 12 and iPhone X series devices
 RAD Server Console UI redesign and migration to the Ext JS framework
 Improved FireDAC support for Firebird 3.0.4 and Firebird embedded
 New VCL and FMX Multi-Device Styles 
 IDE Productivity Components
 Quality improvements to over 150 customer reported issues

Delphi 10.3.2 Update 2
Released July 2019, Update 2 and included:
 Delphi macOS 64-bit
 RAD Server Wizards and Deployment Improvements
 Android Push Notification Support with Firebase
 Delphi Linux FireMonkey GUI Application Support
 Delphi Android 64-bit support
 macOS Catalina (Delphi) and iOS 13 support
 RAD Server Docker support

Delphi 10.3.3 Update 3
Released November 2019, Update 3 included:
 Delphi Android 64-bit support
 Delphi iOS 13 and macOS Catalina support
 RAD Server Docker deployment
 Improved App Tethering stability
 Improved iOS push notification support
 Debugger improvements

Embarcadero Delphi 10.4 Sydney
On May 26, 2020, Embarcadero released RAD Studio 10.4 Sydney with new features such as:
 Major Delphi Code Insight improvements
 Unified Memory Management across all supported platforms
 Enhanced Delphi multi-device platform support
 Unified installer for online and offline installations
 Windows Server 2019 support
 Parallel programming component updates
 Metal API support on OS X and IOS. See full list of changes

Delphi 10.4.1 Update 1
Released September 2020, Update 1 included:
 850+ enhancements and fixes
 Windows Server 2019 support
 Multi-monitor and 4k scaling improvements
 Parallel programming component updates

Delphi 10.4.2 Update 2 

Released February 24, 2021, Update 2 included:

 New VCL controls: TControlList and TNumberBox
 MSIX app packaging format support
 Installer supports silent, automated installations
 Enhanced Migration Tool
 Major compiler/IDE speed increases (over 30 IDE fix pack integrations)
 Android 11, macOS11, iOS 14 support

Embarcadero Delphi 11 Alexandria
On September 9, 2021, Embarcadero released RAD Studio 11 Alexandria with new features including:
 High-DPI enabled IDE
 VCL styles in the form designer
 FireMonkey design guidelines
 macOS ARM 64-bit target platform
 Android API 30 support

Delphi 11.1 Update 1

On March 15, 2022, Embarcadero released RAD Studio 11.1 with new features including:

 Many IDE Improvements
 Extensive High DPI IDE quality, plus improved use of the IDE with Remote Desktop 
 Improvements with High DPI designers for VCL and FireMonkey and the styled VCL form designer
 GetIt Library Manager enhancements
 Code Insight Across Delphi and C++Builder
 The Delphi LSP engine saw big performance improvements
 The Delphi and C++ compilers for the various platforms were improved in terms of stability and performance
 Improved RTL, UI, and Database Libraries

Delphi 11.2 Update 2

Released September 5, 2022, Update 2 included:

 Quality-focused release
 Removing Internet Explorer
 iOS Simulator for Delphi

Delphi 11.3 Update 3

Released February 27, 2023, Update 3 included:

 IDE enhancements, notably around ToolsAPI and Delphi LSP
 Quality improvements in all areas of the application
 Ubuntu 22 and Windows Server 2022 support

References

External links
Delphi Fandom Page  
Delphi Version Release Dates

 
Pascal (programming language)
Pascal (programming language) software
Software version histories
History of software